Ralph Adam Fine (February 14, 1941 – December 5, 2014) was an American judge, author, and television personality who served on the Wisconsin Court of Appeals from 1988-2014.

A former attorney for the United States Department of Justice, Fine gained public attention as an author and Milwaukee television host before seeking public office. As a Milwaukee County Circuit Court judge from 1979–88, Fine was known for his staunch opposition to plea bargaining, a position which helped secure his election to District I of the state Court of Appeals in 1988. He served on the Milwaukee-based court until his death in December 2014.

Early life and career
Fine was born in New York City, the son of New York Supreme Court justice Sidney A. Fine and impressionist artist Libby Poresky.

He graduated from Tufts University in 1962 and received his law degree from Columbia Law School in 1965. Following his graduation, Fine was a law clerk to Judge George Rosling of the United States District Court for the Eastern District of New York and worked for three years as an appellate attorney in the United States Justice Department Civil Division. After leaving the Justice Department, Fine relocated to Brown Deer, Wisconsin and became a full-time writer, publishing a legal novel titled Mary Jane vs. Pennsylvania, a critique of the pharmaceutical industry, and several law journal articles.

In 1972, he contested the Democratic nomination for Wisconsin's 9th congressional district, but was defeated; he later worked for WITI, hosting a legal affairs program called A Fine Point.  As host of A Fine Point, Fine interviewed Nobel Prize laureates Elie Wiesel and Milton Friedman.

Judicial career
In 1979, Fine was elected to the Milwaukee County Circuit Court; during his campaign, he emphasized his opposition to plea bargaining.

While serving in the court's felony division in 1985, Fine presided over the trial and sentencing of Daniel McDonald, a Lafayette County judge who had murdered the law partner of an electoral rival.

In 1987, after he received a large volume of substitution demands from defense counsel, Fine was transferred to the circuit court's civil division.

In 1988, Fine challenged Wisconsin Court of Appeals Judge Ted E. Wedemeyer, Jr. for his seat on the court's Milwaukee-based District I.  Touting his support of a stricter criminal justice system, Fine received the endorsement of The Milwaukee Sentinel and easily unseated Wedemeyer in the April general election.

In 1989, Fine unsuccessfully challenged Wisconsin Supreme Court Justice Shirley Abrahamson; he ran once more for the Supreme Court, again unsuccessfully, in 1996.

As an appellate judge, Fine participated in a number of notable cases. In 2007, he served on a disciplinary panel that recommended the censure of Wisconsin Supreme Court Justice Annette Ziegler, who, while a circuit court judge, had violated conflict of interest provisions in the state's judicial ethics code. In 2008, he served on a similar panel which reviewed potential campaign misconduct  allegedly committed by Justice Michael Gableman; this panel recommended no discipline. In 2014, Fine dissented from a Court of Appeals ruling affirming the conviction of Kelly Rindfleisch, deputy chief of staff to Scott Walker when he served as Milwaukee County Executive.

Death
Fine died on December 5, 2014 in Milwaukee after a brief illness.

Select bibliography

Mary Jane vs. Pennsylvania
The Great Drug Deception: The Shocking Story of MER/29 and the Folks Who Gave You Thalidomide
Fine's Wisconsin Evidence
Escape of the Guilty
The How-to-Win Trial Manual: Winning Trial Advocacy in a Nutshell (5th ed. 2011)

References

1941 births
2014 deaths
20th-century American Jews
Wisconsin Court of Appeals judges
Wisconsin lawyers
Writers from New York City
Lawyers from New York City
Writers from Milwaukee
Lawyers from Milwaukee
Tufts University alumni
Columbia Law School alumni
20th-century American judges
21st-century American judges
20th-century American lawyers
21st-century American Jews